If I Should Fall Behind may refer to:

 "If I Should Fall Behind", a song by Bruce Springsteen from the 1992 album Lucky Town, also recorded by:
 Dion DiMucci on the 1992 album Dream on Fire
 Linda Ronstadt on the 1998 album “We Ran”
 Faith Hill on the 1999 album Breathe 
 Robin and Linda Williams on the 2002 album Visions of Love
 The Wave Pictures on the 2009 single "If I Should Fall Behind"
 Paul Carrack on the 2012 album Good Feeling
 Derek Ryan from the 2013 album Country Soul
 Margo Timmins on the 2021 album The Ty Tyrfu Sessions
 If I Should Fall Behind, a short documentary about the 2012 album We Have Made A Spark by Rose Cousins

See also
If I Should Fall (disambiguation)